Kongur Tagh, which means "a brown mountain" in Uyghur language, has a significant subpeak known as Kongur Tiube (公格尔九别峰 which means in the local language "the mountain with a white cap", also Kongur Tiubie / Jiubie and Kungur Tjube Tagh), ; elevation = .Ranked 46th  It is moderately independent, with a topographic prominence of . It was first climbed in 1956.

Footnotes

See also
 Karakoram Highway
 Kongur Tagh

References
 Ward, Michael. (1983). "The Kongur Massif in Southern Sinkiang." The Geographical Journal, Vol. 149, No. 2 (Jul., 1983), pp. 137–152.

External links

 

Mountains of Xinjiang
Highest points of Chinese provinces
Seven-thousanders of the Pamir
Tashkurgan Tajik Autonomous County